Hisar (Gissar) is a city in western Tajikistan, about 15 km west of Dushanbe. The city was the seat of the former Hisar District, and is part of the Districts of Republican Subordination. It lies at an altitude of 799–824 m, surrounded by high mountains (Gissar Range to the north, Babatag and Aktau ranges to the south). The river Khanaka, a tributary to the Kofarnihon, flows through the town. Its population is estimated at 29,100 for the city proper and 308,100 for the city with the outlying communities (2020). As of 2002, its population was composed 81.6% of Tajiks, 12.3% Uzbeks, 3.6% Russians, and 2.5% others.

History 
The fort of Hisar, residence of the Bukharan governor, is said to date back to Cyrus the Great and to have been captured twenty one times.

In 1504 the region was conquered by Muhammad Shaybani. Babur briefly conquered Hisar in 1511, but came back under control of the Uzbeks not long after. Hisar became a semi-independent principality in the next few decades and was ruled by a sultan, furnishing troops for Bukhara's military campaigns. In the 17th century the Uzbek Yuz tribe became the dominant power in the region, obtaining the governorship of Hisar . During this period the Bukharan khanate was split between the khan in Bukhara and the ruler (usually one of his relatives) in Balkh, and Hisar was generally subordinate to the latter. The decline of Bukharan power after the assassination of Ubaydullah Khan in 1711 resulted in Hisor asserting its independence.

Hisar was made a city on June 26, 1993.

Subdivisions
Before ca. 2018, Hisar was the seat of Hisar District, which covered the rural part of the present city of Hisar isor. The city of Hisar covers Hisar proper, the town Sharora and ten jamoats. These are as follows:

Geography

Climate
Hisar has a hot-summer Mediterranean climate (Köppen climate classification Csa).

References

External links

Populated places in Districts of Republican Subordination